Po Klaung Yăgrai (1151 - 1205) was king of the Champa polity of Panduranga.

Title
Po Klaung Yăgrai is the royal title, not the name. According to legend, he came from the popular types with name Jatol. His title Po Klaung Yăgrai means the "king of dragons" or "dragon king of Jarai people" in the Cham language.

It includes of "Po" is the king, "klaung" is the dragon and "Yăgrai" is the Jarai people.

History
Po Klaung Yăgrai ruled from 1167 to his death and is credited to have built many irrigation works and dams. He probably is the same person as Champa king, Jaya Indravarman IV. He is worshipped at the Po Klong Garai Temple, built by Champa King Jaya Sinhavarman III (Chế Mân).

Legend 
He started life as a lowly cowherd, but became king of Champa by destiny, ruling wisely and for the good of the people.  When the Khmer of Cambodia invaded his kingdom, he challenged them to settle the matter peacefully in a tower-building contest. Po Klaung Garai prevailed in the contest, thereby obliging the invaders to return home. After his death, Po Klaung Garai became a god and protector of the people on earth; it is said that the tower he built in his contest with the Khmer is the tower that today is known by his name.

See also
 Battle of Tonlé Sap
 Jaya Indravarman IV

References

External links
 Temple of Po Klaung Yăgrai

 
1151 births
1205 deaths
People from Ninh Thuận province
Kings of Champa
Jarai people
Vietnamese Hindus
Hindu monarchs